Nibal Yamout (born July 27, 1993 in Beirut) is a Lebanese swimmer, who specialized in breaststroke events. At age fifteen, Yamout became the youngest athlete to represent Lebanon at the 2008 Summer Olympics in Beijing, and competed for the women's 100 m breaststroke event. She swam in the second heat of the event, finishing in fifth place, and forty-fifth overall, with a time of 1:16.17.

References

External links
NBC Olympics Profile

Lebanese female swimmers
Living people
Olympic swimmers of Lebanon
Swimmers at the 2008 Summer Olympics
Lebanese female freestyle swimmers
Sportspeople from Beirut
1993 births
Swimmers at the 2010 Summer Youth Olympics